The Kurama or T'kurmi or Akurmi language is a Kainji language of Nigeria. Kurama speakers are found in the central northern Nigerian states of Kaduna, Bauchi, Borno, Kano, Jigawa and Plateau.

88% of the population of the Akurmi people are Christians.

Further reading
The Akurmi people of central Nigeria. Akurmi Study group, 2012.

References

East Kainji languages
Languages of Nigeria

External links
 Verb Phrase in Kurama